Barszczewo refers to the following places in Poland:

 Barszczewo, Gmina Choroszcz
 Barszczewo, Gmina Michałowo